John Randolph Winckler (October 27, 1916 – February 6, 2001) was an American experimental physicist notable for his discovery of sprites in 1989

and other discoveries in the fields of solar, magnetospheric, auroral, and atmospheric physics.

He was also notable for designing new methods and apparatus to collect scientific data from high altitude flying objects such as balloons, rockets, and spacecraft. This data collection led Winckler and his staff to major discoveries, such as: discovering that high-energy electrons accompany auroras.
Winckler was an advisor to NASA, and a member of the National Academy of Sciences.

Notable awards and distinctions 
 1953 Fellow of the American Physical Society
 1962 American Institute for Aviation and Astronautics, Space Science Award
 1965-66 Guggenheim fellow, France
 1972 Doctor honoris causa, Universite Paul Sabatier, Toulouse, France
 1978 Arctowski Medal, National Academy of Sciences
 1985 Soviet Geophysical Committee International Geophysical Year Commemorative Medal
 1991 NASA Medal for Exceptional Scientific Achievement
 1996 Member, the National Academy of Sciences

Chronology 
 October 27, 1916, born, North Plainfield, New Jersey
 1942: B.S., Rutgers University
 1946: Ph.D., Princeton University
 1946: joins faculty of Princeton University
 1949–1986: University of Minnesota, Assistant Professor to Professor of Physics
 1986–2001: University of Minnesota, Emeritus Professor of Physics

References 

1916 births
2001 deaths
People from North Plainfield, New Jersey
20th-century American physicists
Princeton University alumni
Rutgers University alumni
Princeton University faculty
University of Minnesota faculty
Members of the United States National Academy of Sciences
Fellows of the American Physical Society